Tomban (also Romanized as Tombān and Tonbān) is a village in Howmeh Rural District, in the Central District of Qeshm County, Hormozgan Province, Iran. At the 2006 census, its population was 941, consisting of 244 families.  The village suffered heavily in the 2005 Qeshm earthquake.

References 

Populated places in Qeshm County